The Alabama State House is a state government building in Montgomery, Alabama, United States. It houses several state agencies, most notably the Alabama Legislature, which comprises the Alabama Senate and the Alabama House of Representatives.

History
The State House was opened in 1963 as the Alabama Highway Department Building. It housed the Alabama Department of Transportation, then known as the Alabama State Highway Department,  until 1985, when the Alabama Legislature moved into the upper floors while the Alabama State Capitol building was being renovated. Article IV, Section 48 of the Alabama Constitution requires the Legislature to meet in the Capitol, but Amendment 427 was passed to enable it to select another place to temporarily meet until renovations at the Capitol were complete.  Although all major renovations were completed there in 1992, the Legislature has remained at the State House.  The building was renamed after the 1985 move. Originally, the Legislature occupied the 5th through 7th floors. When the Legislature outgrew this space, an eighth floor was added.

Structure and usage
The State House has seven above ground floors and one at basement level. The first floor, located at basement level, is used for miscellaneous offices and committee rooms. The second floor contains the Governor's Legislative Office and the Alabama Budget Office. The third floor houses the Attorney General. The fifth and sixth floors are dedicated exclusively to the use of the House of Representatives. The seventh and eighth floors are likewise used by the Senate.  Additionally, the Lieutenant Governor's offices are located on the seventh floor.

Proposed replacement 
Currently, the Alabama Legislature is making preparations to plan and construct a new State House.  Many legislators cite a need for a new facility due to the lack of space in the current State House as well as issues with mold and other structural problems.  Proposals have included building a new facility on the opposite end of Dexter Avenue from the Capitol, to create a government mall.  This plan has lost favor. New plans have called for building a wing behind the State Capitol that contains space for the Legislature.  In the 2009 session, legislators debated and passed a bill to begin investigating proposals, but have not taken any action on constructing a new facility.

On May 7, 2020, it was reported that Alabama State Senator Del Marsh had requested $200,000,000 of CARES Act funding in order to build a new State House. After backlash from various Alabama citizens, the funding request was removed.

See also
Government of Alabama
List of state and territorial capitols in the United States

References

State government buildings in Alabama
Alabama Legislature
Politics of Alabama
Buildings and structures in Montgomery, Alabama
Government buildings completed in 1963
1963 establishments in Alabama